is a Japanese professional golfer.

Sato played on the Japan Golf Tour, winning twice. Both wins came in 1979, in the Fujisankei Classic and the Hokkaido Open.

Professional wins

Japan Golf Tour wins
1979 Fujisankei Classic, Hokkaido Open

Other wins
1980 Tobu Pro-Am

Senior wins
2015 Japan Professional Gold Senior Championship Golf Partner Cup

External links

Shoichi Sato at the PGA of Japan official website

Japanese male golfers
Japan Golf Tour golfers
Sportspeople from Hokkaido
1947 births
Living people